Silk Route was an Indian band consisting of Mohit Chauhan (lead vocals, backing guitars, lyrics ), Atul Mittal (lead guitars, clarinet, backing vocals), Kem Trivedi (keyboards), and Kenny Puri (percussion and drums). The band is much endeared for the song Dooba-Dooba from their acclaimed debut album in 1998, Boondein. As a result, it gained acclaim in the Indian film industry, and was then furnished opportunities to score and perform songs for movies such as Kalpana Lajmi's "Kyon", "Lets Enjoy" and "Urf Professor".They confess to such diverse influences as Sting, Simon & Garfunkel and Dire Straits, all of which find their way into the Silk Route sounds. The band always added a distinct touch to their music by using acoustic guitars, talking drums and harmonica and primarily by of the use of Recorder, a 17th-century European folk musical instrument played by Kem Trivedi.The band dissolved in the early 2000s.

When asked about his plans regarding forming a band in a recent interview with The Express Tribune, Chauhan replied:

Discography 
 Boondein (1998)

 Pehchaan (2000)

References

External links
 Silk Route at Lastfm
 Silk Route at Radio City
 Silk Route at iTunes

Indian musical groups
Musical groups established in 1997
Musical groups disestablished in 2008
Indian musical trios